Concord School is a historic building and former school (Concord Elementary School) in Oak Grove, Oregon. The school was built by the Works Progress Administration, and closed in 2014. Clackamas County has considered moving the Oak Lodge Library to the building. The building was named one of Oregon's Most Endangered Places by Restore Oregon. North Clackamas Parks and Recreation District took ownership of it in March 2018.

References

Buildings and structures in Clackamas County, Oregon
Former school buildings in the United States
Oak Grove, Oregon
Works Progress Administration in Oregon